Humberto Antonio Mendoza (born October 2, 1984) is a Colombian football centre back.

Club career

Mendoza debuted as a professional in 2002 playing for Atlético Bucaramanga. He was then transferred to Atlético Nacional.

In January 2011, the defender was transferred to Colón of Argentina, for his first experience outside his native country. After an unsuccessful six months spell at Colón he returned to Colombia to play for his current club.

International career

Mendoza's first call for the Colombia national football team was in 2005, to play the CONCACAF Gold Cup.

Honours

Club

Atlético Nacional
Fútbol Profesional Colombiano: 2005 Apertura, 2007 Apertura, 2007 Finalización

External links

1984 births
Living people
People from Bucaramanga
Colombian footballers
Colombia international footballers
2005 CONCACAF Gold Cup players
Association football defenders
Atlético Bucaramanga footballers
Atlético Nacional footballers
Club Atlético Colón footballers
Real Cartagena footballers
Envigado F.C. players
Independiente Santa Fe footballers
Atlético Veragüense players
San Francisco F.C. players
Peruvian Primera División players
Categoría Primera A players
Categoría Primera B players
Argentine Primera División players
Colombian expatriate sportspeople in Argentina
Colombian expatriate sportspeople in Panama
Colombian expatriate sportspeople in Peru
Expatriate footballers in Argentina
Expatriate footballers in Panama
Expatriate footballers in Peru
Sportspeople from Santander Department